Wilbur Marvin "Moose" Thompson (April 6, 1921 – December 25, 2013) was an American shot putter who won a gold medal at the 1948 Summer Olympics.

While studying at Modesto Junior College, Thompson won the national junior college title in 1939 and 1940. He then served in the US Army during World War II, and in 1946 placed second at the NCAA championships while at USC. He held a world ranking of #6 in 1947, #2 in 1948, #3 in 1949 and #4 in 1950. Thompson graduated with a master's degree in petroleum engineering and later worked in the oil production and at the California State Lands Commission. He died aged 92.

His grandson, McLeod Bethel-Thompson, is a professional quarterback in the Canadian Football League.

References

1921 births
2013 deaths
People from Spink County, South Dakota
American male shot putters
Olympic gold medalists for the United States in track and field
Athletes (track and field) at the 1948 Summer Olympics
USC Trojans men's track and field athletes
Track and field athletes from South Dakota
Medalists at the 1948 Summer Olympics
United States Army personnel of World War II